Tembesi River is a river in Jambi province, Sumatra island, Indonesia, about 600 km northwest of the capital Jakarta. It is a tributary of the Batang Hari River. Tributaries include the Merangin River.

Geography
The river flows in the central area of Sumatra with predominantly tropical rainforest climate (designated as Af in the Köppen-Geiger climate classification). The annual average temperature in the area is 23 °C. The warmest month is October, when the average temperature is around 24 °C, and the coldest is January, at 22 °C. The average annual rainfall is 2893 mm. The wettest month is December, with an average of 346 mm rainfall, and the driest is June, with 101 mm rainfall.

See also
List of rivers of Indonesia
List of rivers of Sumatra

References

Rivers of Jambi
Rivers of Indonesia